Michael Vega (born September 4, 1969 in Colorado Springs, Colorado) is an American actor. He grew up in central New Jersey and attended Trenton State College where he studied theatre and communications. After spending several years in New York City, Vega moved in 2002 to the San Francisco Bay Area and has enjoyed great success in theatre, including appearances in Schoenberg by John Fisher, Bent by Martin Sherman, and A Queer Carol by Joe Godfrey, all at Theater Rhinoceros in San Francisco, and The Gravedigger's Tango by Ian Walker at the Phoenix Theater in San Francisco.

Vega starred as Ishi in a play based on Ishi's life presented July 3–27, 2008, at Theatre Rhinoceros. Written by the theater's artistic director, John Fisher, the play addresses many angles of the Ishi story. The San Francisco Chronicle said the work "is a fierce dramatic indictment of the ugliest side of California history".

In 2008, he starred in his first feature film Beatific Vision, co-starring Marianne Shine.

References

External links
Official Website

1969 births
Living people
American male actors
The College of New Jersey alumni
People from New Jersey